Suratha was a Chitravanshi emperor of the ancient Vanga Kingdom (Historical Bengal Region).  He was also a proverbial person of Hindu lore. His capital was in Bolipura, now Bolpur city of West Bengal. He was a devotee of Devi Durga. According to the Markandeya Purana he preached the Devi Mahatmya (Sri Sri Chandi) in Marthya (earth) among the dweller of Marthya and also he was the first organizer of durga puja in Ganga and later this durga puja festival became popular in other parts of India.

Background

Source of information
Much of the available information about Surath comes from Devi Mahatmya of Markandeya Purana.
Capital of Surath's kingdom:
The 12th and 15th lines of the Devi Mahatmya calls  "tat swapuramayato nijadeshadhipohbhabat" (তত: স্বপুরমায়াতো নিজেদেশাধিপোহভবৎ)
The word "Swapura" probably refers to "Supur". Surath was a king of "Swapur"(স্বপুর) in present-day "Supur", Bolpur of West Bengal.This place is mentioned in Markandeya Purana:

History of first Durga Puja
King Surath is mentioned as Chitraguptvanshi King(Descendant of Chitragupt) in Durga Saptshati Devi Mahatamya and Markandey Puran. He lost his kingdom and all his property. Losing everything he left his capital Bolipur (currently Bolpur) to re-explore his fate. Later, he met with Vaishya Samadhi, who was a businessman. Coincidentally he also was bankrupt, as he was cheated with his family. Then, fortunately they met Sumedhas Muni. Sumedhas advised them to bring back their fate they must worship the Goddess Devi Durga.

King Surath and Boishyo (Vaisya) Samadhi worshipped Devi Durga as Durga Puja or Durgotsob at the ashram of Medhas Muni in the Garh Jungle of West Bengal. It was the first durgapuja of world. In current days, the ghar jungle is in Durgapur, Purba Bardhaman, West bengal. They worshipped Devi durga in spring time. So, this festival is called Basanti puja or "Basanto kalin durgotsob". According to Sri Sri Chandi, they made this durga image clay in the Garh jungle. After puja Surath returnback all his lost property and he came back to his capital Bolipur(now Bolpur). Surath enrooted durgapuja in his capital Bolpur in spring. During this puja, he sacrifice(sacrifice in Bengali is "boli") lakhs of animal. From this Bengali term "boli"(animal sacrifice), this place called as "Bolipur"(currently Bolpur).

Surath in popular mass media
In the day of Mahalaya, there is a cultural drama performance in DD Bangla (a Bengali entertainment television channel sponsored by India govt.) where king surath is regarded as the first worshiper of the Goddess (Devi) Mahisasuramardini.

References

Durga Puja
Emperors